Likabali, a town in the foothills, is the Headquarters of Lower Siang district of Arunachal Pradesh in the Arunachal Pradesh state of India.

The town is part of the Likabali (Vidhan Sabha constituency). The Member of Legislative Assembly is Kardo Nyigyor.

References

Cities and towns in Lower Siang district
Lower Siang district